Better Together is the debut extended play by American girl group Fifth Harmony. It was their first release after placing third on the second season of American televised reality show The X Factor, and was released on October 18, 2013 through Epic Records. Lyrically, the extended play discusses themes of love, heartbreak and empowerment. Throughout the recording process, the group worked with a variety of music producers including Savan Kotecha and Harmony Samuels as well as Julian Bunetta who served as the executive producer of the extended play. Better Together is primarily a pop record with elements of funk, pop rock, power pop, dance, bubblegum pop, acoustic guitar, R&B and minimalist urban influences.

Following the release of Better Together, two Spanish language versions of the extended play, Juntos and Juntos Acoustic, were both released to digital music stores on November 8, 2013, while a physical bundle of both versions packaged together was released exclusively at Walmart on November 11, 2013. An acoustic version of Better Together was released to digital music stores on four days later, with physical copies sold exclusively at Justice stores. All together it managed to sell 51k copies on the first week. Finally, a remix extended play was released exclusively to iTunes on November 25, 2013. A four disc Better Together: Deluxe Edition set started selling exclusively on Fifth Harmony's official store on December 3, 2013, consisting of the standard five-track extended play, along with Better Together: Acoustic, Juntos, Juntos Acoustic and a card to download the remix extended play.

The extended play is preceded by the single "Miss Movin' On" which peaked at number 76 on the Billboard Hot 100. Better Together debuted at number six on the Billboard 200. A song that was not on the album but was promoted on the group's Harmonize America tour was "Tellin' Me". The extended play was also promoted via the promotional singles "Me & My Girls" and the title track, "Better Together". The iTunes edition available for digital download also included "Me & My Girls" alongside the five tracks found on the standard edition, and the Target edition came with the bonus track "One Wish".

Background
Fifth Harmony spoke about the extended play in an exclusive interview, saying "It’s definitely going to sound different. All of the songs have a common thread – they’re all a genre of pop, we’ve got a ballad in there. There’s an 80’s song in there, they all sound really different, but there is a connection there".

Music and lyrics

Better Together features five different tracks and consists mainly of pop that explores
'80s-inspired dance-pop, pop rock, minimal urban music and bubblegum pop. The members of Fifth Harmony cowrote the songs "Don't Wanna Dance Alone", "Who Are You", and "Me & My Girls".

The extended play opens with the '80's-inspired track "Don't Wanna Dance Alone" which has an uptempo dance beat and incorporates elements of funk music. The song gained comparisons to Whitney Houston's I Wanna Dance with Somebody (Who Loves Me) for having a similar message and upbeat sound.

The second track is the lead single "Miss Movin' On", whose lyrical content delivers a message of empowerment by expressing the feeling of "moving on from a relationship". As noted by David Greenwold from Billboard, the "empowering track fulfills the group's promise of "fun pop". Sugarscape compared the track to the musical style of Demi Lovato. It has a power pop-influenced chorus.

The title track Better Together is a throwback R&B-pop song, with critics comparing its sound to the musical style of Mariah Carey and Ariana Grande. The fourth track "Who Are You" is the only ballad present in the extended play, containing a slow piano melody and strings harmonizing around. The last track "Leave My Heart Out Of This" is a pop rock song with acoustic guitar during the first verses and a breakdown, receiving comparisons to Demi Lovato's "Heart Attack".

Promotion

The group served as one of the opening acts for Cher Lloyd's I Wish Tour which commenced on September 6, 2013. All of the songs appearing on the extended play were performed as part of their setlist, including bonus tracks that appear on the iTunes and Target versions.
On the day of the release of Better Together, Fifth Harmony were interviewed during a 30-minute "Live From MTV" stream on MTV. They also performed "Miss Movin' On" on Live with Kelly and Michael and The Arsenio Hall Show.

The quintet appeared on VH1's Big Morning Buzz Live with Carrie Keagan on October 23. Other promotional visits during the week of release included visits to Billboard headquarters and a trip to the top of the Empire State Building with members of the media for photo ops and short interviews. Autograph signing events for the extended play included stops at Westfield Sunrise Mall in Massapequa, New York on October 22, 2013 and Smith Haven Mall in Lake Grove, New York on October 23, 2013.

Singles
"Miss Movin' On" was released as the group's debut and lead single on July 16, 2013. The song debuted at number 85, and peaked at number 76 on the Billboard Hot 100, spending a total of eleven weeks there and charting at number 27 on the Billboard Pop Singles chart. The song was certified Gold in the United States for selling combined sales and track-equivalent streams units of 500,000 in June 2014.
"Me & My Girls" was released as a promotional single through Radio Disney and reached number 4 on the Bubbling Under Hot 100, number 17 on the Heatseekers Songs, and number 53 on Digital Songs.

Commercial performance
Better Together charted at number six on the Billboard 200, handing the group their first ever top ten entry with first week sales of 23,000, it also debuted at number three on Digital Albums. It also debuted at number 18 on the New Zealand Albums Chart and at number 22 on the Canadian Albums Chart.

The extended play's subsequent releases, Juntos Acoustic peaked at number five on Latin Pop Albums, while Better Together: The Remixes debuted at number 20 on Billboard Dance/Electronic Albums. Juntos debuted at number two on both the Billboard Top Latin Albums and Latin Pop Albums charts.

Track listing

Notes
  signifies a language adapter

Personnel
Credits for Better Together adapted from AllMusic.

Locations
Recorded at Enemy Dojo and The Guest House Studios and Arundei Studios (Calabasas, California), Westlake and R8D Studios (West Hollywood, California)

Vocals

Ally Brooke – lead vocals, background vocals
Normani Kordei – lead vocals, background vocals
Dinah Jane – lead vocals, background vocals
Lauren Jauregui – lead vocals, background vocals
Camila Cabello – lead vocals, background vocals

Instruments
Freddie Fox – guitar
Harmony Samuels – instrumentation
Julian Bunetta – instrumentation

Technical and production

Dan Book – vocal production
Jose Cardoza – engineer
Peter Carlsson – vocal engineer
Tom Coyne – mastering
Jason Evigan – composer, production, whistle
Rickard Göransson – vocal production
The Monsters – production
Mick Guzauski – mixing
Serban Ghenea – mixing
John Hanes – engineer
Stefan Johnson – engineer
Carlos King – engineer
Julian Bunetta – engineer, mixing, production
Savan Kotecha – vocal production
Harmony Samuels – production
Strangerz – production
Suspex – engineer, production, programming
PJ Bianco – production

Visuals and imagery

Glenn Ellis – hair stylist
JP Robinson – art director, design
Julian Peploe – art director, design
Joseph Llanes – photography
Alex Verdugo – make-up
Soulmaz Vosough – stylist

Charts

References

2013 debut EPs
Fifth Harmony albums
Albums produced by Harmony Samuels
Albums produced by Jason Evigan
Epic Records EPs
Spanish-language EPs